Benton City is the name of some places in the United States of America:

Benton City, Missouri
Benton City, Washington
Benton City, Texas (ghost town)

See also 
Benton (disambiguation)
Benton Station (disambiguation)
Bentonville (disambiguation)
Fort Benton (disambiguation)